Jonathan Lu or Lu Zhaoxi (born 1969) is an honorary partner of Alibaba Group. From 2013 to 2015, Lu served as Alibaba's CEO. He was succeeded by Daniel Zhang.

Biography

Early life and education 
When Lu was in highschool, he wanted to be an architect. However, according to his statements, he forgot to complete a page on his Gaokao Exam and ended up getting a degree in hotel management from Guangzhou University. After graduation, he worked as a receptionist at a Holiday Inn in Guangzhou.

Career 
According to his public statements, before being tapped to become CEO, Lu worked at Alibaba for 13 years, including stints with the business-to-business division (alibaba.com), Taobao.com, and Yun OS.

In 2013, Jack Ma selected Lu as his successor as CEO. During his tenure as CEO, Lu oversaw Alibaba's $21.8 billion IPO. At the end of his tenure, Alibaba was doing well, beating market expectations, but there were rumors that Jack Ma, Alibaba's founder, no longer trusted Lu's ability to run the company. 

In 2015, Lu was the first senior manager to be named an "Honorary Partner", effectively retiring. , Lu has a net worth of 1.1 billion US Dollars.

References 

1969 births
Alibaba Group people
Guangzhou University alumni
Chinese chief executives
Businesspeople from Guangzhou
Chinese computer businesspeople
Living people
21st-century Chinese businesspeople
Billionaires from Guangdong